The term Spaceguard loosely refers to a number of efforts to discover, catalogue, and study near-Earth objects (NEO), especially those that may impact Earth (potentially hazardous objects).

Asteroids are discovered by telescopes which repeatedly survey large areas of sky. Efforts which concentrate on discovering NEOs are considered part of the "Spaceguard Survey," regardless of which organization they are affiliated with.

A number of organizations have also raised related discussions and proposals on asteroid-impact avoidance.

The United Kingdom hosts the self-styled The SpaceGuard Centre which conducts astrometric research (MPC code J26) and is open to the general public daily, but it is not affiliated with or supported by any public body.

History 
Arthur C. Clarke coined the term in his novel Rendezvous with Rama (1973) where "Project Spaceguard" was the name of an early warning system created following a fictional catastrophic asteroid impact. This name was later adopted by a number of real life efforts to discover and study near-Earth objects. The name was used for the Survey "with the permission and encouragement of Clarke."
A 1992 US Congressional study produced a "Spaceguard Survey Report" which led to a mandate that NASA locate 90% of near-Earth asteroids larger than 1 km within 10 years.  This is often referred to as the "Spaceguard Goal."  A number of efforts which receive money through NASA are all considered to be working on the "Spaceguard Project."

The effect of the impact of Comet Shoemaker–Levy 9 to Jupiter in July 1994 created a greater perception of importance to the detection of near Earth objects. As David Levy stated in an interview "The giggle factor disappeared after Shoemaker-Levy 9." He was referring to the contemporary attitude that extinction level events were so improbable that those advocating for research for detection and possible deflection methods were only paranoid alarmists. The impact of one of its fragments created a giant dark spot on Jupiter over 12,000 km across, and was estimated to have released an energy equivalent to 6,000,000 megatons of TNT (600 times the world's nuclear arsenal). After the impact of Comet Shoemaker-Levy 9, asteroid detection programs all over the world received greater funding.

The Working Group on Near-Earth Objects (WGNEO) of the International Astronomical Union held a workshop in 1995 entitled Beginning the Spaceguard Survey which led to an international organization called the Spaceguard Foundation. Subsequently, there have been Spaceguard associations or foundations formed in countries around the world to support the ideas of discovering and studying near-Earth objects.  Generally, the Spaceguard organizations formed within individual countries are associated with the international foundation or with the NASA efforts only by name, common interests, and similar goals.

The initial Spaceguard Goal was achieved, although in slightly longer than 10 years.  An extension to the project gave NASA the mandate of reducing the minimum size at which more than 90% of near-Earth asteroids are known to 140 m.

Observations 

The 2002 Eastern Mediterranean event, the 2002 Vitim event (Russia) and the Chelyabinsk meteor (Russia, February 2013) were not detected in advance by any Spaceguard effort. On October 6, 2008, the 4-meter 2008 TC3 meteoroid was detected by the Catalina Sky Survey (CSS) 1.5 meter telescope at Mount Lemmon, and monitored until it hit the Earth the next day.

New survey projects, such as the Asteroid Terrestrial-impact Last Alert System (ATLAS) program operated by the University of Hawaii, aim to greatly increase the number of small (down to approximately 10 m) impactors that are discovered before atmospheric entry—typically with days to weeks of warning, enabling evacuations of the affected areas and damage mitigation planning.  This is in contrast to other surveys which focus on finding much larger (greater than 100 m) objects years to decades before any potential impacts, at times when they could potentially still be deflected away from Earth.

Another short-term warning system is the NASA Scout program that came into operation in 2016.

On October 19, 2017, one of the Survey telescopes, Pan-STARRS 1, discovered the first interstellar asteroid, 'Oumuamua.

Issues 
According to Dr. Michael F. A'Hearn, a typical mission would take too long from approval to launch if there was an emergency:

Lack of a master plan and dangers of false alarms have been pointed out by Stefan Lövgren.

See also 

 Spaceguard Foundation
 Bisei Spaceguard Center
 Japan Spaceguard Association
 Asteroid-impact avoidance (includes list of survey projects)
 B612 Foundation
 NEOShield
 Planetary Defense Coordination Office
 Impact event
 Tunguska event, 1908
 List of meteor air bursts
 Chelyabinsk meteor, Russia, February 2013

References

Further reading 

 Air Force 2025.  Planetary Defense: Social, Economic, and Political Implications,  United States Air Force, Air Force 2025 Final Report webpage, December 11, 1996.
 Daugherty, Laura and Emily Van Yuga. What Damage Have Impacts Done to Humans in Recorded History? (Geol 117: Meteorite Impacts in Space and Time), Oberlin College Geology Department, Oberlin College, May 11, 2001.
 Halliday, I., A.T. Blackwell, and A.A. Griffin.  "Meteorite Impacts on Humans and Buildings",  Nature, pp. 318–317.  [bib. of Yau et al.]
 Lapaz, L.  "Effects of Meteorites on the Earth",  Advances in Geophysics, Vol. 4, pp. 217–350.  [bib. of Yau et al.]
 Lewis, J.S. Rain of Iron and Ice: The Very Real Threat of Comet and Asteroid Bombardment, Reading, MA: Addison-Wesley Pub. Co., 1996;  Basic Books, 1997, . [OBIS]
 Nield, Ted. Don't wrong the meteorite: Ted Nield thinks it's time to reassess our attitude to cosmic impacts. Meteorites are our friends, Geoscientist Online, The Geological Society, October 2008.
 Norton, O.R.  "Rocks from Space".  Missoula Montana: Mountain Press Publishing Company, 1998.  [course textbook].
 Paine, M.P. Bigger Telescopes Seek Killer Asteroids Archive from Space.com April 2000.
 Reimold, W. U. and R. L. Gibson, Anton Pelser, Mauritz Naudé, Kevin Balkwill. Meteorite impact!: the danger from space and South Africa's mega-impact the Vredefort structure, Chris van Rensburg, 2005, .
 "Special Report: Death and Property Damage Due to Meteor Destruction", UFO Research: Cincinnati!,  November, 1998.
 Swindel, G.W. Jr., and W.B. Jones. Meteoritics, Vol. 1, pp. 125–132.  [bib. of Lapaz 1958].
 Webb, S.K.  A Novel Measure of Meteorite Flux",  [meteorite-list] How Many Meteorites Fall?,  November 30, 2000.
 Worthey, G. Meteor Near Misses and Strikes,  St. Ambrose University Astronomy, 11 October 1999.
 Yau, K., Weissman, P., & Yeomans, D. Meteorite Falls In China And Some Related Human Casualty Events, Meteoritics, 1994, Vol. 29, No. 6, pp. 864–871, bibliographic code: 1994Metic..29..864Y.

External links 
 Spaceguard Central Node 
 NASA's Near-Earth Office Program
 NEO News: Spaceguard Survey of Near Earth Asteroids  David Morrison Tuesday, August 1, 2000 (Discovery statistics by 2000)
 Progress in the Spaceguard Survey Saturday, February 9, 2002 (Status report by 2002)
 UK Spaceguard Centre
 Planetary Defense Foundation
 Australian Spaceguard news and links
 Priority List

Astronomical surveys
Planetary defense organizations